Slovak Economic Association (SEA, Slovak: Slovenská ekonomická spoločnosť) is an association of professional economists in Slovakia. Since 2008, the association has organized annual conferences. Notably, in 2017 the Nobel Prize winner Robert F. Engle gave a keynote speech at the SEA conference in Košice. Since 2018, the Association awards bi-annual award to a Slovak economist under 40 years of age for an outstanding contribution to economic research and evidence-based policy making in the country named after Martin Filko. SEA is a member of the International Economic Association.

References 

Economics societies